The black-banded trevally (Seriolina nigrofasciata) is a species of carangid native to the Indian Ocean, the western Pacific Ocean, and the Atlantic coast of southeastern South Africa. It is of minor importance to local commercial fisheries, but is popular as a gamefish. This species is the only known member of its genus.

References

Naucratinae
Fish described in 1829
Taxa named by Eduard Rüppell